This is a list of Anglican churches in Melbourne. It covers all metropolitan and suburban areas which have a postcode, excluding the rural areas added to the city in 2009.

See also 
 List of Anglican churches

 
Lists of churches in Australia
Melbourne-related lists
Churches
Melbourne Churches
Anglican Churches In Melbourne